Onagrodes eucineta is a moth in the family Geometridae. It is found on Peninsular Malaysia and Borneo.

References

Moths described in 1958
Eupitheciini